Sir Kand (also Romanized as Sīr Kand; also known as Sherkhān, Shīr Khān, and Sīr Kan) is a village in Shamsabad Rural District, in the Central District of Arak County, Markazi Province, Iran. At the 2006 census, its population was 191, in 54 families.

References 

Populated places in Arak County